Saška Đurović (born 4 September 2001) is a Montenegrin volleyball player. She plays as middle blocker for French club Saint-Raphaël Var Volley-Ball.

International career
She is a member of the Montenegro women's national volleyball team. She participated in the qualifications for the Women's European Volleyball Championship in 2019, 2021 and 2023.

Awards

Club
OK Tent
 Serbian League: 2020

References

External links
Saška Đurović at CEV.eu

2001 births
Living people
Expatriate volleyball players in France